Antonio Folco (4 October 1906 – 28 June 1983) was an Italian racing cyclist. He finished in last place in the 1934 Tour de France.

References

External links
 

1906 births
1983 deaths
Italian male cyclists
People from Novi Ligure
Cyclists from Piedmont
Sportspeople from the Province of Alessandria